Lefty Smart is an American former Negro league pitcher who played in the 1930s.

Smart played for the Indianapolis ABCs in 1932. In 12 recorded appearances on the mound, he posted a 3.06 ERA over 64.2 innings.

References

External links
 and Seamheads

Year of birth missing
Place of birth missing
Indianapolis ABCs (1931–1933) players